Jack Higgins (born August 19, 1954) is an American editorial cartoonist for the Chicago Sun-Times.

Early life and career
Higgins was born in Chicago, Illinois. He graduated from St. Ignatius College Preparatory School and the College of Holy Cross with a B.A. in Economics.

He began editorial cartooning for its student newspaper before he started freelancing for the Chicago Sun-Times. He became a full-time cartoonist for the paper in 1981. Higgins was a finalist for the Pulitzer Prize for Editorial Cartooning in 1986; he won in 1989.

Higgins was for many years syndicated through Universal Press Syndicate. He ceased syndication in July 2007, opting to create more local cartoons for his paper.

Awards
 1984, 1987, 1992, 1994, 1996, 1997, 1998, 1999, 2000, 2001, 2003:
Peter Lisagor Award, Society of Professional Journalists
 1986:
Pulitzer Prize Finalist for Editorial Cartooning
 1987:
Award for Outstanding Commentary, Chicago Association of Black Journalists
 1988:
Sigma Delta Chi Award for Editorial Cartooning
International Salon of Cartoons, First Prize
 1989:
Pulitzer Prize for Editorial Cartooning
 1993, 1995, 2007, 2009:
Herman Kogan Award, Chicago Bar Association
 1994:
Robert F. Kennedy Award finalist
 1996:
Illinois Journalist of the Year
 1997:
The Best of the Press, Illinois Press Association
 1998:
Sigma Delta Chi Award for Editorial Cartooning
John Fischetti Award
 2000:
The Best of the Press, Illinois Press Association
 2004:
College of the Holy Cross - Sanctae Crucis Award

References

External links
 NCS Bio

American editorial cartoonists
Artists from Chicago
Pulitzer Prize for Editorial Cartooning winners
1954 births
Living people
St. Ignatius College Prep alumni
Chicago Sun-Times people